The 2008–09 Swedish Figure Skating Championships were held at the Cloetta Center in Linköping between December 4 and 7, 2008. Because they were held in December, they were officially designated by the Swedish skating federation as the 2008 Swedish Championships, but the champions are the 2009 Swedish Champions. Senior-level (Olympic-level), junior-level, and two age-group levels of novice (Riksmästerskap (RM) and UngdomsSM (USM)) skaters competed in the disciplines of men's singles, ladies' singles, and pair skating, although not every discipline was held in every level. This event was used to help choose the Swedish teams for the 2009 World Championships, the 2009 European Championships, and the 2009 World Junior Championships.

Senior results

Men

Ladies

Junior results

Men

Ladies

Pairs

Novice USM results

Boys

Girls

Novice RM results

Boys

Girls

Pairs

External links
 2008–09 Swedish Championships results

2008 in figure skating
2009 in figure skating
Swedish Figure Skating Championships
Figure Skating Championships
Figure Skating Championships
Sports competitions in Linköping